Henry Waltham (died 1668) was an English politician who sat in the House of Commons  in 1660.

Waltham was the son of Henry Waltham of Weymouth who was MP in 1628.  He was in business supplying naval stores. On the outbreak of the Civil War, he joined the parliamentary army. He was made a freeman of Weymouth in 1647. He was an alderman from 1649 to 1662 and served as  mayor from 1657 to 1658. In 1658 he was commissioner for sequestrations for Dorset. He stood unsuccessfully for parliament at Weymouth in 1659, but was elected Member of Parliament for Weymouth and Melcombe Regis in 1660 for the Convention Parliament. He did not stand in 1661 and in 1662 he refused oaths and was removed from the corporation.

Waltham married Ruth Lindsay, daughter of Edward Lindsay merchant of Weymouth, before 1646.

References

Year of birth missing
1668 deaths
English MPs 1660
Roundheads
Mayors of places in Dorset